Huang Zhiquan (born February 1942) is a Chinese politician. He served as Governor of Jiangxi Province and was a member of the 16th Central Committee of the Chinese Communist Party.

Biography
Huang was born in 1942 in Tongxiang, Zhejiang, China. He graduated from Zhejiang Agricultural University (now part of Zhejiang University). Huang's political career has been mainly in Jiangxi Provincial Government.

Career highlights
 1984–1991, Deputy Director of the Jiangxi Provincial Planning Committee;
 1984–1993, Director of the Jiangxi Provincial Planning Committee;
 1991–1993, Assistant for the Governor of Jiangxi Province;
 1993–1995 & 1998 ~ 2001, Vice-Governor of Jiangxi Province;
 1995–1998 & 2001 ~ present, Deputy Secretary-in-General of Jiangxi Province;
 1997–2002, Standing Member the 15th Central Committee of the Chinese Communist Party;
 2001–2006, Governor of Jiangxi Province;
 2002–2007, Member of the 16th Central Committee of the Chinese Communist Party.

References

1942 births
Living people
Zhejiang University alumni
Governors of Jiangxi
People's Republic of China politicians from Zhejiang
Chinese Communist Party politicians from Zhejiang
People from Tongxiang
Politicians from Jiaxing